Boron is a chemical element with symbol B and atomic number 5.

Boron may also refer to:

 Boron (surname)
 Boron, California, a census-designated place in the United States
 Boron Air Force Station
 Boron, Ivory Coast, a town
 Boron, Mali, a town and commune 
 Boron, Territoire de Belfort, a commune département in France
 Boron Oil, a subsidiary and brand of Standard Oil of Ohio, acquired by BP
 Bodhu Boron, an Indian wedding ritual 
Boron (TV series), an Indian Bengali-language TV series 
 Isotopes of boron

See also
 B (disambiguation)